The British L-class submarine was originally planned under the emergency war programme as an improved version of the British E-class submarine. The scale of change allowed the L class to become a separate class.

The armament was increased when the 21-inch torpedoes came into service. The Group 3 boats had two QF 4-inch guns fore and aft of the lengthened conning tower. Also, 76 tons of fuel oil was carried in external wing tanks for the first time in British submarines. Several of the Group 1 boats were configured as minelayers including L11 and L12. In the Group 2 boats, L14, L17 and L24 to L27 were built as minelayers carrying 16 mines but without the two beam  torpedo tubes.

The introduction of the L class came too late to contribute significantly in World War I.  was accidentally depth-charged by three American destroyers in early 1918.  torpedoed the German submarine .  torpedoed the German destroyer S33 in October 1918 but was sunk by accompanying destroyers.  was sunk with all hands lost in a collision with the battleship  during an exercise off Portland Bill in the English Channel on 10 January 1924.

 was sunk in 1919 during the British naval intervention in the Russian civil war by Bolshevik Russian destroyers. She was salvaged by the Russians and who re-commissioned her with the same name.

The L class served throughout the 1920s and the majority were scrapped in the 1930s but three remained operational as training boats during World War II. The last three were scrapped in 1946.

Parts of uncompleted L-class submarines were used for the Yugoslav s.

Design
The L class emerged as an improvement on the earlier E class; the first two members of the L class were originally ordered as lengthened E-class boats, and were initially named E57 and E58. The design returned to the circular pressure hull of the E-class boats, as the irregularly shaped hulls of the G and J classes had proved to be unsuccessful, particularly because the circular hull shape was much better at withstanding the force of underwater explosions.

Characteristics

The L-class boats were divided into three separate sub-classes: the I, II, and III types. They displaced  surfaced and  submerged. The II-type boats were slightly longer, at  overall, with the same beam and draught. They displaced  surfaced and  submerged. They displaced more than their half-sisters, at  surfaced and  submerged. The three sub-classes had crews of 35, 38, and 44, respectively.

All three sub-classes had the same propulsion system: two diesel engines for use while surfaced and two corresponding electric motors for use submerged. They could cruise at  while surfaced and  while submerged.

The L-class submarines were armed with a primary armament of six torpedo tubes. The Type-I boats were equipped with six  tubes, with four in the bow and two on the broadside. These were supplied with a total of ten torpedoes. The Type-II boats exchanged the 18-inch bow tubes for more powerful  tubes; these had eight torpedoes in total. The 18-inch broadside tubes retained a single torpedo apiece. Those Type-II submarines that were completed as minelaying submarines kept their bow tubes but were not fitted with the broadside tubes. They instead had a capacity for fourteen to sixteen naval mines. The Type-III boats were equipped with six 21-inch tubes, all located in the bow. The first two sub-classes were also equipped with a  deck gun for use whilst surfaced, while the Type-III submarines had two such guns. The gun was mounted on a revolving platform on the bridge level to increase its range and permit it to engage surfaced enemy submarines beyond torpedo range and in heavier seas.

Members of the class

Group 1 (L1-class)

Group 2 (L9-class)

 
 
 
 
 
 
 
 
 
 
 
 
 
 
 
 
 
 
 L28 to L32 were broken-up after commencement
 
 L34 and L35 were cancelled
 L36 to L49 were not ordered
 L50 and L51 were cancelled

Group 3 (L50-class)

 
 
 
 
 
 L57 to L68 were cancelled
 
 L70 was cancelled
 
 L72 to L74 were cancelled

Notes

References

Further reading

 

L class submarine, British